Bruno Ferreira Mombra Rosa, better known as Bruno Mezenga (born August 8, 1988, in Niterói), is a Brazilian footballer who plays as a striker for CSA, on loan from Ferroviária.

Career

Flamengo
He made his professional debut at the age of 16 for Flamengo in a 0–1 defeat to São Caetano on May 22, 2005, for the Campeonato Brasileiro Série A championship.

In 2005, he was also selected to be part of the Brazil national under-17 football team at the 2005 FIFA U-17 World Championship where Brazil lost in the final against Mexico by 3–0. Bruno Mezenga played 2 matches in the tournament, including the final where he was a used substitute.

Orduspor
He was on trial out with Orduspor for the 2008–2009 season and he became Turkish Football Federation First League Top Scorer.

Legia Warszawa
In May 2010, he was loaned to Legia Warszawa on a one-year deal. He returned to Flamengo one year later.

Red Star Belgrade
On June 22, 2011, it was announced that Bruno will be joining Red Star Belgrade for a season-long loan deal.
In his debut, Bruno scored goal in a UEFA Europa League match against Ventspils.

Orduspor
On January 3, 2012, Bruno Mezenga rejoined Orduspor on a free transfer, signing a four and half year contract.

Career statistics
(Correct )

according to combined sources on the Flamengo official website and Flaestatística.

1 Including 1 match in the Rio de Janeiro State League.
2 Including 12 matches and 2 goals in the Rio de Janeiro State League.
3 Including 6 matches and 4 goals in the Rio de Janeiro State League.

Honours

Clubs
Flamengo
Copa do Brasil: 2006
Rio de Janeiro State League: 2007
Brazilian Série A: 2009

Legia Warszawa
Polish Cup: 2010/11

Red Star Belgrade
Serbian Cup: 2011/12

National team
Brazil U-17
2005 FIFA U-17 World Championship: Silver medal

Individual
TFF First League top goalscorer: 1
 2008–09

References

External links
 
 official Flamengo profile at Flapedia 
 Diario article  
  
 Bruno Mezenga Stats at Utakmica.rs

1988 births
Living people
Brazilian footballers
Brazilian expatriate footballers
Association football forwards
CR Flamengo footballers
Fortaleza Esporte Clube players
Associação Ferroviária de Esportes players
Goiás Esporte Clube players
Centro Sportivo Alagoano players
Orduspor footballers
Legia Warsaw players
Red Star Belgrade footballers
Akhisarspor footballers
Ekstraklasa players
Campeonato Brasileiro Série A players
Campeonato Brasileiro Série B players
Serbian SuperLiga players
Süper Lig players
Expatriate footballers in Turkey
Brazilian expatriate sportspeople in Turkey
Expatriate footballers in Poland
Brazilian expatriate sportspeople in Poland
Expatriate footballers in Serbia
Sportspeople from Niterói